Diósgyőr-Vasgyári Testgyakorlók Köre, more commonly Diósgyőri VTK is a Hungarian sports club from Diósgyőr district of Miskolc best known for its football team. Founded in 1910 by the local working class youth, the team plays in the second division of the Hungarian League and has spent most of its history in the top tier of Hungarian football. Diósgyőr is best known for its passionate supporters – in the past years Diósgyőr had one of the highest average attendances in the Hungarian top division. The football club enjoyed its first golden age in the late 1970s and early 1980s, including a third place in the 1978–79 season of the Hungarian League and two Hungarian Cup triumphs in 1977 and 1980.

History

Crest and colours

Naming history
1910–38: Diósgyőri VTK
1938–45: Diósgyőri MÁVAG SC
1945–51: Diósgyőri VTK
1951–56: Diósgyőri Vasas
1956–92: Diósgyőri VTK Miskolc
1992–00: Diósgyőr FC
2000–03: Diósgyőri VTK
2003–04: DVTK 1910
2004–05: Diósgyőri Balaton FC (later Diósgyőri VTK-BFC)
2005–07: Diósgyőri VTK
2007–08: Diósgyőri VTK-BORSODI
2008–: Diósgyőri VTK

Manufacturers and shirt sponsors
The following table shows in detail Diósgyőri VTK kit manufacturers and shirt sponsors by year:

Stadia and Facilities

The home of the club is the multi-purpose Diósgyőri Stadion located in Miskolc, Borsod-Abaúj-Zemplén County, Hungary. The maximum capacity of the stadium is approximately 17,000 spectators.

They played their matches from 1911 to 1939 near the canteen of the Diósgyőr Ironworks. The stadium was first opened on 25 June 1939.

In 1968, the stadium has undergone major expansions and the capacity has increased to 22,000. The stadium was then reopened after renovations on 26 May 1968. At that time, it was the biggest stadium in Hungary outside of Budapest. The highest attendance record for the stadium was set on 27 November 1968, when approximately 35,000 people saw a match between the DVTK and the Ferencvárosi TC. In the 2000s, its capacity was dropped to 15,000 due to security reasons sections of the stadium was closed from the public.

Prior to demolition in 2016, the stadium had the following areas: the western Main Stand that was built in 1939. Three other wings were built in 1968, with a grass surface and a tartan covered running track, where football matches and athletic championships are held. The Complex contains one grass surfaced training field built in 1977, one with artificial turf built in 2006, and two others with cinder covering that opened in the 1960s. The artificial grass field has lighting. Near the stadium, there is a covered training field and a former boxing arena re-opened for soccer in 2009. Although the stadium does not meet the standards of many other European stadiums, it is the most modern arena in Eastern Hungary. Floodlighting was installed and began operating on 15 November 2003.

The Main Stand had its first renovation in 2005–06 and after a significant modernization project, it was opened on 23 April 2006 with a roof over 1,504 seats. In 2009–2010, the eastern-wing of the 40-year-old stands was demolished. For the 100th birthday of the club, new covered stands were built with a buffet, restrooms, and 3,137 seats on the so-called "Sunny wing" or "Napos oldal". This wing was so-named because the sun would make it difficult for fans to watch matches during afternoon competition. Construction began on 10 August 2009 and an opening ceremony was held on 6 March 2010. The 2009–10 renovation cost 400 million HUF. In 2011–2012, the training fields were modernized, and two additional fields were built. Currently, there are four training fields with floodlights, two with natural grass and 2 with artificial grass.

From 1992 to 2000, the field was named DFC Stadium due to the club changed its name from DVTK to Diósgyőri Football club. During the 2007–2008 season, the name of the stadium was DVTK-Borsodi Stadium, because of a sponsorship arrangement.

A famous section of the stadium called the Csáki-stand is named after the fan, József Csáki.

In 2016, the construction of a new stadium has been started.

On 20 June 2017, it was announced that Diósgyőr is not able to play their home matches at the Mezőkövesdi Városi Stadion due to the turf cannot endure it. As a consequence, Diósgyőr will play the home matches of the 2017–18 Nemzeti Bajnokság I matches at stadium of Debreceni VSC', Nagyerdei Stadion, in Debrecen.

On 5 May 2018, the new stadium was opened officially. The first official match was played between Diósgyőr and Mezkőkövesd in the 2017–18 Nemzeti Bajnokság I season. The match ended with a 1–0 win for the Borsod-rival Mezőkövesd. The first goal was scored by Dražić in the 88th minute of the game.

Supporters
Diósgyőr has one of the most supporters in Hungary and almost everybody in the town is fond of football. In the 2007–08 season, the average number of attendance in Diósgyőr matches was 5,063, with DVTK being the most visited team in NB I. On the season peak, 10,000 fans encouraged the team. In the 2011–12 season, the average number of fans was 7,793, with the most visited team at the top, while the season peaked at 11,398 at the stadium, which meant a full house. The relationship with the Nyíregyháza, Ferencváros, and Újpest supporters is particularly bad. DVTK fans have previously sympathized with the other red and white team in East Hungary, DVSC supporters. In recent years, a friendly relationship with the supporters of Szeged has evolved and they have a friendship with the Polish fans of GKS Bełchatów.

On 19 July 2014, UEFA issued sanctions against Ferencváros and Diósgyőr and Slovakia’s Spartak Trnava, following racist behaviour by their fans during 2014–15 UEFA Europa League qualifying matches against Maltese sides Sliema Wanderers, Birkirkara and Hibernians respectively. Ferencvaros were the hardest hit by the UEFA measures as club were fined by €20,000 and the partial closure of their stadium following monkey chants and racist banners displayed in both legs in Malta and Hungary.

Honours

Domestic

League
Nemzeti Bajnokság II:
Winners (6): 1949–50, 1953, 1956, 1962–63, 1973–74, 2010–11
Runners-up (3): 1965, 1990–91, 1996–97

Cups
Magyar Kupa:
Winners (2): 1976–77, 1979–80
Runners-up (4): 1941–42, 1965, 1980–81, 2013–14
Ligakupa:
Winners (1): 2013–14

Players

Current squad

Out on loan

Non-playing staff

Board of directors

Management

Statistics

Record departures

Record arrivals

See also
History of Diósgyőri VTK
List of Diósgyőri VTK seasons
Diósgyőri VTK in European football
List of Diósgyőri VTK managers

References

Sources
Lajos Varga: Diósgyőri Futballtörténet (Diósgyőr Soccerhistory)

External links
 
Friends for the Diósgyőr Football 
Amíg Élek Én fan site 

 
Football clubs in Hungary
Sport in Miskolc
Diósgyőr
1910 establishments in Hungary
Association football clubs established in 1910